The 1981–82 Scottish Inter-District Championship was a rugby union competition for Scotland's district teams.

This season saw the 29th Scottish Inter-District Championship. It saw the first entry of the Scottish Exiles - then known as the Anglo-Scots - side into the Championship.

South and Edinburgh District shared the competition with 3 wins and a draw.

1981-82 League Table

The North and Midlands match with the Anglo-Scots was deemed as invalid; as the Exile side fielded ineligible players. The match was not replayed.

Results

Round 1

Glasgow District: 

Anglo-Scots:

Edinburgh District: 

North and Midlands:

Round 2

Glasgow District: 

Edinburgh District: 

South: 

North and Midlands:

Round 3

Match played at Murrayfield was only deemed a bounce game as the Anglo-Scots were without key players and their team was augmented by North and Midlands players.

North and Midlands: 

Anglo-Scots:

Round 4

Edinburgh District: 

South:

Round 5

Glasgow District: 

South: 

Edinburgh District:

Anglo-Scots:

Round 6

Anglo-Scots: 

South: 

North and Midlands: 

Glasgow District:

Matches outwith the Championship

Other Scottish matches

Glasgow: 

Rest of the West:

Junior matches

Midlands: 

South:

South: 

Glasgow District:

Glasgow District: 

Midlands District: 

Midlands District: 

Midlands District U21:

Glasgow District: 

Edinburgh District:

Edinburgh District: 

South of Scotland District:

Edinburgh District: 

Midlands District:

English matches

Glasgow District: 

Northumberland: 

Durham County: 

South of Scotland District: 

Warwickshire: 

Anglo-Scots:

Irish matches

South of Scotland District: 

Ulster:

French matches

Edinburgh District 'B': 

Perpignan: 

Edinburgh District: 

Perpignan:

Trial matches

Blues: 

Whites:

International matches

Edinburgh District: 

Romania: 

South of Scotland District: 

Romania:

References

1981–82 in Scottish rugby union
1981–82